Kastor und Pollux, also known as Forum Frankfurt, are two high-rise buildings in the Gallus district of Frankfurt, Germany. The twin towers, which are 22 and 33 floors, respectively, were named after Castor and Pollux, the Dioscuri of Greek and Roman mythology.

Location and design
Pollux and Kastor were designed by Kohn Pedersen Fox and built between 1994 and 1997. The buildings are located near Messeturm and Tower 185 as well as the train station. Between the two buildings is a green space featuring a fountain and a light sculpture, Synergie, by Swiss artist Christian Herdeg. Kastor was awarded an LEED Gold Certificate in 2014.

Tenants
Zurich Insurance Group has been the main tenant in Pollux since early 2017, working from 17 of the building's 33 floors. TechQuartier, Aon, and Lavazza also have space there. DO Deutsche Office AG and Alstria Office AG both rent space in Kastor.

See also
 List of tallest buildings in Frankfurt
 List of tallest buildings in Germany

References

Skyscrapers in Frankfurt
Office buildings completed in 1997
Twin towers
Skyscraper office buildings in Germany